Montgomery County is a county in the U.S. state of New York. As of the 2020 census, the population was 49,532. The county seat is Fonda. The county was named in honor of Richard Montgomery, an American Revolutionary War general killed in 1775 at the Battle of Quebec.

Historically occupied by the Mohawk people, one of the original Five Nations of the Iroquois Confederacy, the county was created in 1772 during the period of British colonial rule as Tryon County. In 1784, after the Americans gained independence in the War, it was renamed Montgomery County for one of the heroes.

Montgomery County comprises the Amsterdam, NY Micropolitan Statistical Area. The county borders the north and south banks of the Mohawk River.

History

This area was occupied by the Mohawk for hundreds of years prior to European colonization. Many warriors allied with the British during the war. When the British lost, they ceded all the Iroquois territory of the Six Nations (the Tuscarora had joined the confederacy in the 18th century) to the United States, without consulting the tribes or bringing them into negotiation.

In 1784, following end of the American Revolutionary War, the European-American settlers renamed Tryon County as Montgomery County. This change was to honor the general, Richard Montgomery, who had captured several places in Canada and died in 1775 attempting to capture the city of Quebec during the Revolutionary War. It replaced the name that formerly honored the last provincial governor of New York.

In 1789, Ontario County was split off from Montgomery. The area of the new county was much larger than the present Ontario County, as it included the present Allegany, Cattaraugus, Chautauqua, Erie, Genesee, Livingston, Monroe, Niagara, Orleans, Steuben, Wyoming, Yates, and part of Schuyler and Wayne counties.

In 1791, Herkimer, Otsego, and Tioga counties were split off from Montgomery. In 1802, portions of Clinton, Herkimer, and Montgomery counties were combined to form St. Lawrence County. In 1816, Hamilton County was split off from Montgomery, but it did not have enough taxable inhabitants to be separately organized until 1847. In 1838, Fulton County was split off, with former county seat Johnstown no longer in Montgomery County's boundaries. Fonda would be the new county seat, with Johnstown maintaining that rank for the new Fulton County.

In 2012, Montgomery County voters approved a charter for government, making it the 21st county in New York state to do so. In 2013, Matthew L. Ossenfort was elected at-large as the first County Executive in the county's history. Ossenfort took office in 2014, the same year the charter went into effect.  Under the terms of the charter, the Board of Supervisors was replaced by a nine-member County Legislature, with members elected from single-member districts. Thomas L. Quackenbush, one of the members, was elected as the first Chairman of the new legislative body, which will be a circulating position.

Congressional districts
 1789-1797 - None
 1797-1803 - NY9
 1803-1809 - NY13
 1809-1813 - NY9
 1813-1823 - NY14
 1823-1833 - NY16
 1833-1843 - NY15
 1843-1853 - NY17
 1853-1873 - NY18
 1873-1875 - NY19
 1875-1893 - NY20
 1893-1913 - ?
 1913-1945 - NY30
 1945-1953 - NY31
 1953-1963 - NY32
 1963-1971 - NY35
 1971-1973 - NY28 & NY29
 1973-1983 - NY28 & NY31
 1983-1993 - NY23 & ?
 1993-2003 - NY21 & NY23
 2003-2012- NY21
 2013–present - NY19 & NY20

Geography

Montgomery County is located in the central part of the state, west of the city of Schenectady and northwest of Albany.

Adjacent counties
 Fulton County - north
 Saratoga County - east
 Schenectady County - east
 Schoharie County - south
 Otsego County - southwest
 Herkimer County - west

The Erie Canal runs through Montgomery County parallel to the Mohawk River, connecting to the Wood River to the west, which leads to Lake Ontario. Overall, the canal connected Great Lakes shipping with the Hudson River and the port of New York on the Atlantic Ocean.  Several towns and villages developed along the canal, as it carried much trade and passenger traffic during its peak years. After the railroad was built through the state, along the same river plain, it superseded the canal, which was filled in some areas.

At the time of the canal's construction, Montgomery County was the only place where there was a break in the Appalachian Mountains.  Called 'The Noses' because of canal construction, it became known as "the gateway to the West". In the mid-twentieth century, the NYS Thruway was constructed parallel to the former east–west routes of the canal and railroad. Today the Erie Canal and its lock system is used primarily for recreational boat use among locals and tourists.

Montgomery County is located in the heart of the state's Mohawk Valley region. Foothills of the Catskill Mountains dot the southern part of the county, while foothills of the Adirondack Mountains dot the north.

Demographics

As of the census of 2010, there were 50,208 people, 20,073 households, and 13,131 families residing in the county.  The population density was 123 people per square mile (47/km2).  There were 22,522 housing units at an average density of 56 per square mile (21/km2).  The racial makeup of the county was 92.87% (83.8% Non-Hispanic; 9.07 White Hispanic) White, 1.15% African American, 0.25% Native American, 0.53% Asian, 0.01% Pacific Islander, 3.92% from other races, and 1.27% from two or more races. Hispanic or Latino of any race were 12.91% of the population. 19.0% identified as being of Italian, 15.9% German, 13.5% Polish, 9.8% Puerto Rican 9.1% Irish, 7.9% American and 6.4% English ancestry, according to Census 2010. 86.8% spoke English, 9.3% Spanish,1.8% Italian, and 1.1% Polish as their first language.

There were 20,038 households, out of which 29.40% had children under the age of 18 living with them, 49.00% were married couples living together, 11.60% had a female householder with no husband present, and 34.60% were non-families. 29.50% of all households were made up of individuals, and 14.90% had someone living alone who was 65 years of age or older.  The average household size was 2.42 and the average family size was 2.98.

In the county, the population was spread out, with 24.50% under the age of 18, 7.20% from 18 to 24, 26.30% from 25 to 44, 22.90% from 45 to 64, and 19.20% who were 65 years of age or older.  The median age was 40 years. For every 100 females there were 91.40 males.  For every 100 females age 18 and over, there were 87.90 males.

The median income for a household in the county was $33,128, and the median income for a family was $40,688. Males had a median income of $31,818 versus $23,359 for females. The per capita income for the county was $17,005.  About 9.00% of families and 13.7% of the population were below the poverty line, including 17.80% of those under age 18 and 9.89% of those age 65 or over.

2020 Census

Politics and government

Up until 2022, western Montgomery County lay in New York's 19th Congressional District, while the Eastern half lay in New York's 20th Congressional District; the former was represented in Congress by Pat Ryan and the latter was represented in Congress by Paul Tonko, a lifelong resident of Amsterdam, NY. Starting with the 2022 midterm elections, all of Montgomery County is in New York's 21st Congressional District.

In 2012, voters approved a county charter under New York's municipal home rule law which established an independent county executive to head its executive branch and replacing the board of supervisors with a nine-seat county legislature.  Elections were held the next year and the county began operating under this charter on January 1, 2014.

|}

Communities

City
 Amsterdam

Towns

 Amsterdam
 Canajoharie
 Charleston
 Florida
 Glen
 Minden
 Mohawk
 Palatine
 Root
 St. Johnsville

Villages

 Ames
 Canajoharie
 Fonda (county seat)
 Fort Johnson
 Fort Plain
 Fultonville
 Hagaman
 Nelliston
 Palatine Bridge
 St. Johnsville

Census-designated place
 Tribes Hill

Hamlets
 Auriesville
 Fort Hunter
 Freysbush
 Minaville
 Sprakers
 Sprout Brook
 Valley Brook

Notable people
 Joseph Brant, Mohawk Indian, was a Mohawk military and political leader, based in present-day New York, who was closely associated with Great Britain during and after the American Revolution. He and his family were from Canajoharie, New York.
 Charles Couch, Wisconsin state legislator, was born in Mohawk in Montgomery County in 1833.
 Bud Fowler, African American baseball player.  He was the first African American professional baseball player. He was born in Fort Plain, New York.
 Sheldon Jackson, Presbyterian missionary, was born in Minaville in Montgomery County in 1834.
 Cady Staley, 1st President of Case School of Applied Science (now Case Western Reserve University), was born in Minaville in Montgomery County in 1840.
 Kirk Douglas, actor.
 George A. Mitchell, founder of Cadillac, Michigan
 David Pietrusza, author.

See also

 List of counties in New York
 National Register of Historic Places listings in Montgomery County, New York
 Fort Johnson Volunteer Fire Company

References

Further reading

External links
 Montgomery County, NY
 
 "Fulton-Montgomery Photo Archives"
 "Glovers and Tanners"

 
1772 establishments in the Province of New York
Populated places established in 1772